Haqqu (English: right) is a 1996 Maldivian drama film produced and directed by Yoosuf Rafeeu. Produced under Bukhari Films, the film stars Reeko Moosa Manik, Mariyam Nisha and Mariyam Shakeela in pivotal roles.

Plot
Shahid (Reeko Moosa Manik) was sitting on the breakwater when Areesha (Mariyam Shakeela) accidentally knocks him into the sea. He lashes out to her though she kept smiling shyly. Areeka hid Shahid's wallet and invited him to her house if he wants the wallet. Areeka's father, Imad and Shahid's father, Amjad (Roanu Hassan Manik) are childhood best-friends. They decided to marry their kids off despite Shahid's dissent. However, he determined to marry Areeka, solely for the sake of his parents. Before their marriage, Shahid meets Lamha (Mariyam Nisha) whom he fell in love instantly. Shahid disclose to Areeka that he loves another woman whereas Areeka considered it a jest.

Shahid took a vacation and spends time in an island where he again meets Lamha. He declares his affection towards her but Lamha wanted nothing more than friendship since she was aware of his planned marriage. Amjad was informed of Shahid's affair who warn him not to do anything that will harm their family's reputation. Shahid kept secretly meeting Lamha, concerning his parents. Lamha attended Shahid and Areesha's wedding party and it was revealed that Lamha and Areesha know each other and they are friends. Shahid continuously keeps avoiding Areesha. One night, Shahid took Lamha to the cinema while Areesha requesting to take her with him. Areesha's friend break the news to her and she secretly follows him to Lamha's house. She confronted Lamha to leave Shahid alone. Lamha divulged her affection towards Shahid.

Lamha and Hameed (Easa Shareef) ploys to create a scene in order to make Shahid detest Lamha. Hameed informs Shahid that Lamha is a promiscuous woman. Refusing to believe, Shahid goes to Lamha's house and witness her with another man in the darkness. Shahid apologised to Areesha and decided to move on with her. Nine months later, she gives birth to a daughter. One day when Shahid was visiting Hameed, he sees Lamha with Hameed and was disturbed to hear Lamha saying she is pleased to see Shahid is in a happy marriage because of her. Shahid suspects Hameed is hiding something from him. He later discovers from Hameed an Areesha that Lamha is in fact a slut but she is a changed woman now.

Cast 
 Reeko Moosa Manik as Shahid
 Mariyam Nisha as Lamha
 Mariyam Shakeela as Areesha
 Easa Shareef as Hameed
 Arifa Ibrahim as Asima; Shahid's mother
 Roanu Hassan Manik as Amjad; Shahid's father
 Abdul Raheem as Imad; Areesha's father
 Nooma Ibrahim as Niya; Areesha's best friend
 Mariyam Haajara as Hameed wife
 Sithi Fulhu as Lamha's mother (special appearance)
 Neena Saleem as Naaznee (special appearance)
 Aminath Rasheedha as Madheeha (special appearance)

Soundtrack

Accolades

References

1996 films
Maldivian drama films
1996 drama films
Dhivehi-language films